is a former Japanese football player.

Club statistics

References

External links
 

1985 births
Living people
Association football people from Osaka Prefecture
Japanese footballers
J1 League players
J2 League players
Japan Football League players
Tokyo Verdy players
Tokushima Vortis players
Fagiano Okayama players
Fukushima United FC players
Iwate Grulla Morioka players
Expatriate footballers in Thailand
Association football midfielders